Deonna Kupryk (née Purrazzo) (born June 10, 1994) is an American professional wrestler currently signed to Impact Wrestling, where she is a former two-time Impact Knockouts World Champion and a former Impact Knockouts World Tag Team Champion. She also appears in Lucha Libre AAA Worldwide (AAA) — with which Impact has a partnership — where she is a former AAA Reina de Reinas Champion. She is also a former Ring of Honor Women's World Champion, making her a four time women's world champion.

Purrazzo began her career in 2012, wrestling in various independent promotions, eventually appearing national promotions Total Nonstop Action Wrestling (TNA) and Ring of Honor (ROH). She also worked for the Japanese promotion World Wonder Ring Stardom (Stardom).  In 2018, while under contract with ROH, she was announced to be part of the independent event All In. Later she signed a contract with WWE and was assigned to the NXT brand. However, she was released in 2020. After her release, Purrazzo signed with Impact Wrestling (the former TNA) and quickly rose through the ranks in the women's division, and would become a four-time women's champion between Impact, AAA, and ROH.

Early life 
Purrazzo was born on June 10, 1994 in Livingston, New Jersey. She grew up in Jefferson Township, New Jersey and attended Jefferson Township High School.

Personal life 
In 2020, Purrazzo started dating fellow Impact wrestler and New Jersey native Steve Maclin.  On February 12, 2022, Purrazzo announced that she and Maclin were engaged. They were married on November 10, 2022.

She considers fellow wrestlers Britt Baker and Chelsea Green as her best friends.

Professional wrestling career

Early career (2012–2016) 
Purrazzo started training at the now defunct D2W Pro Wrestling Academy in December 2012 after she spotted an advertisement for it. She made her in-ring debut in 2013. Purrazzo left D2W in 2014, alongside trainer Damian Adams. Both continued training at Team Adams Training facility in Northern New Jersey. She has attended extra training sessions alongside Rip Rogers at Ohio Valley Wrestling in Louisville, Kentucky.

Ring of Honor (2015–2018) 
Purrazzo is co-credited with starting the "rebirth" of ROH's women's division (officially called Women of Honor), as her ROH debut match against Mandy Leon (in Baltimore, Maryland on July 25, 2015) was ROH's first women's match in roughly a decade. Although losing the contest, this match set the tone for what was to come in WOH. In December 2015 at the 2300 Arena in Philadelphia, Pennsylvania, Purrazzo teamed with Hania "The Howling Huntress" in another losing effort against Mandy Leon and Sumie Sakai. Purrazzo made an appearance at the Ring of Honor Supercard of Honor X in April 2016 where she teamed with Amber Gallows in a tag team match against Solo Darling and Mandy Leon, but lost via submission. On the December 14 episode of ROH's Women of Honor Wednesday webseries, Purrazzo returned to face off against Sumie Sakai in a winning effort. Purrazzo made her first appearance on ROH TV episode that aired on December 10, 2016. Purrazzo defeated Candice LeRae.

On June 23, 2017, at Best in the World, Purrazzo teamed with Mandy Leon in a losing effort against Kris Wolf and Sumie Sakai. During the following night's TV tapings, Purrazzo wrestled a three-way match against Karen Q and Kelly Klein, and was pinned by Karen Q. On the July 29 tapings (uploaded on YouTube on September 6), Purrazzo lost a singles match to Klein, following interference from Karen Q, who attacked Purrazzo during and after the match. On October 13, at Global Wars: Pittsburgh, Purrazzo teamed with Leon and Jenny Rose in a winning effort, against Britt Baker, Faye Jackson and Sumie Sakai.

On January 11, 2018, Purrazzo signed a contract with ROH.

Purrazzo was a featured participant in the ROH Women of Honor Championship tournament, held in the spring of 2018. At ROH Manhattan Mayhem 2018 she won together with Tenille Dashwood in a tag team match against Jenny Rose and Sumie Sakai. Purrazzo advanced to the quarterfinals of the Women Of Honor Championship tournament by defeating Holidead, then was eliminated by World Wonder Ring Stardom's Mayu Iwatani.

Purrazzo left Ring of Honor on July 1, 2018.

Total Nonstop Action Wrestling (2014–2017) 

Purrazzo made her TNA wrestling debut during the May 10, 2014 taping of Total Nonstop Action Wrestling, losing a singles match against Brooke at Knockouts Knockdown II. Deonna returned to TNA on January 8, 2016 at the One Night Only: Live PPV and participated in a number one contender's gauntlet match, where she was eliminated by Awesome Kong. She made a third appearance on March 17, 2016 at Knockouts Knockdown IV where she lost to Madison Rayne. On January 19, 2017, episode of Impact Wrestling, Purrazzo faced Brooke in a losing effort. Purrazzo was also featured in an Xplosion match, losing to Laurel Van Ness.

World Wonder Ring Stardom (2017–2018) 
Purrazzo made her World Wonder Ring Stardom debut, on January 29, 2017. Purrazzo teamed with Christi Jaynes and Shayna Baszler in a six-woman tag team match, with the trio defeating Kagetsu, Kris Wolf and Viper.

On February 4, Purrazzo teamed once again with Baszler and Jaynes in another winning effort against Arisu Nanase, Jungle Kyona and Natsuko Tora. On February 11, Purrazzo and Baszler defeated HZK and Io Shirai and Toni Storm and Zoe Lucas, in a three-way tag team match. On February 18, Purrazzo teamed with Baszler and Jaynes in a winning effort against AZM, HZK and Shirai in a six-woman tag team match. On February 23, Purrazzo unsuccessfully challenged Storm for the SWA World Championship.

Purrazzo returned to Stardom in June 2018.

WWE (2014–2020)

Early appearances (2014–2017) 
In 2014, Purrazzo started working as extra talent for WWE appearing in several skits with Adam Rose as a "Rosebud".

She appeared on the November 11, 2015, episode of NXT where she was defeated by Nia Jax. On the November 19 episode of NXT, Purrazzo lost to Asuka. On the January 13, 2016, episode of NXT, she participated in a battle royal to determine the number one contender for the NXT Women's Championship. She kept appearing throughout 2016, losing to the likes of Asuka, Emma, Nia Jax, and Bayley.

On the December 13, 2016 episode of SmackDown Live, Purrazzo was set to face SmackDown Women's Champion Alexa Bliss, however, Bliss attacked her before the match began.

In 2017, WWE selected Purrazzo as an alternate for its inaugural Mae Young Classic tournament. She wrestled on night two of the tournament in a dark match, teaming with Jessica James to defeat Nicole Matthews and Barbi Hayden.

NXT (2018–2020) 
In early April 2018 during the “WrestleMania Weekend”, WWE offered Purrazzo a contract backstage at a Shimmer Women Athletes show. Though Purrazzo was still under contract to Ring of Honor, she accepted and pulled out of her match at that summer's All In pay per view (a record-setting independent wrestling event produced by what would become AEW). Purrazzo’s WWE signing was reported on May 31, 2018; that same week, WWE announced she would appear in the second Mae Young Classic. On August 22, 2018, Purrazzo fought Bianca Belair in a losing effort. During the Mae Young Classic, Purrazzo advanced to the tournament’s quarterfinals, defeating Priscilla Kelly and Xia Li before losing to Io Shirai. On December 26, 2018, Purrazzo made her NXT UK debut, where she unsuccessfully challenged Rhea Ripley for the NXT UK Women’s Championship, after the match, Ripley attacked Purrazzo until she was rescued by Toni Storm. The following week, Purrazzo fought Storm, where, Storm managed to defeat her. On December 16, 2019, Purrazzo appeared on WWE Raw in a singles match against Asuka, where she was defeated. On the January 15, 2020 episode of NXT, Purrazzo attacked Shotzi Blackheart upon being eliminated from a battle royal by her, also turning heel for the first time. Purrazzo had an unsuccessful match with Blackheart on January 29, 2019. Purrazzo also fought Tegan Nox for the chance to qualify in a No. 1 Contender’s Ladder Match, but Nox defeated her. Purrazzo appeared on the April 6, 2020 episode of Raw in a singles match against the returning Nia Jax, where she was defeated. On April 15, 2020, WWE released Purrazzo and nearly two dozen other wrestlers and producers. During Purrazzo’s 2-year WWE run, she had only 16 televised matches. According to Purrazzo, WWE’s creative team believed she was not yet ready for television.

Return to Impact Wrestling

Knockouts World Champion (2020–2022) 
After Purrazzo's WWE release, Impact Wrestling wrestler/producer Madison Rayne contacted her. One month after, Purrazzo appeared on the May 26 episode of Impact! in a taped promo introducing herself as "The Virtuosa", a wrestler possessing immense technical skill and certainty of her future success. Purrazzo's in-ring debut was on the June 9 episode of Impact!, attacking Knockouts Champion Jordynne Grace and by placing her in the Fujiwara armbar to establish herself as a heel. On July 18 at Slammiversary, Purrazzo defeated Grace by submission to win the championship for the first time. On August 24, during the second night of the Emergence special, Purrazzo made her first successful title defense against Grace in the first Knockouts 30-minute Iron Man match in Impact history, winning two falls to one. At Victory Road, she had another successful title defense against Susie. On October 21, it was confirmed that Purrazzo had signed a long-term deal with Impact Wrestling.

At Bound for Glory, Purrazzo was scheduled to defend the Knockouts Championship against Kylie Rae, however, Rae was injured which Impact hadn't provided an explanation for her absence during the show. Su Yung was the replacement for Rae and defeated Purrazzo, ending her reign at 98 days. On November 14, at Turning Point, Purrazzo won back the title from Yung in a no disqualification match. After she and Kimber Lee were eliminated in the first round of the Knockouts Tag Team Championship Tournament, Purrazzo feuded with Rosemary and Taya Valkyrie, beating them in successful title defenses at Final Resolution and Hard To Kill respectively. On March 13, 2021, at Sacrifice, she defeated ODB to retain her Knockouts title. On April 10, at Hardcore Justice, Purrazzo defeated Jazz in a Title vs. Career match, ending Jazz's in-ring career. At Rebellion, she retained her title against Tenille Dashwood. On May 15, at Under Siege, Purrazzo defeated Havok by submission to successfully retain her title. On June 12, at Against All Odds, Purrazzo defeated Rosemary again to successfully retain her Knockouts Championship. 

At Slammiversary, Purrazzo was scheduled to face a mystery opponent, who was revealed to be Thunder Rosa, however, Purrazzo defeated her and retained her title. After the match, National Wrestling Alliance (NWA) executive producer Mickie James invited Purrazzo to defend the title at NWA EmPowerrr, but Purrazzo give her disrespect and James kicked Purrazzo in the face. At Homecoming, Purrazzo teamed with Matthew Rehwoldt and defeated Hernandez and Alisha Edwards in the first round, Matt Cardona and Chelsea Green in the semifinals, and Decay (Crazzy Steve and Rosemary) in the final to become the Homecoming King and Queen. At Emergence, Purrazzo and Rehwoldt defeated Trey Miguel and Melina. Purrazzo would eventually accept Mickie James' invite, successfully defending the Knockouts Championship against Melina at NWA EmPowerrr. At Knockouts Knockdown, Purrazzo defeated Masha Slamovich, James' handpicked opponent. At Bound for Glory on October 23, Purrazzo lost the title to James, ending her reign at 343 days. At Turning Point, Purrazzo attacked James after she retained the title against Mercedes Martinez, and announced that she would invoke her rematch clause at Hard To Kill. At the event, on January 8, 2022, Purrazzo failed to regain the title, losing to James in a Texas Deathmatch.This was the first time the Knockouts would main event a PPV.

Dual champion and VXT (2022–2023)
On the January 10 episode of Impact!, Purrazzo defeated Rok-C in a Winner Takes All match to retain her AAA Reina de Reinas Championship and also win the ROH Women's World Championship. At Slammiversary, she competed in the inaugural Queen of the Mountain match for the Knockouts World Championship, which was won by Jordynne Grace.

On the July 21 episode of Impact!, Purrazzo alongside Chelsea Green, now collectively known as VXT, faced the Knockouts World Champion Jordynne Grace and Mia Yim, which they were victorious. Ten days later, at Ric Flair's Last Match event, she competed in a three-way match for the title, which was won by Grace after she made Rachael Ellering submit. On August 12, at the Countdown to Emergence pre-show, VXT defeated Rosemary and Taya Valkyrie to win the Impact Knockouts World Tag Team Championship. They lost the title on October 7 at Bound for Glory to The Death Dollz (Jessicka, Rosemary and Valkyrie), ending their reign at 56 days.

Various storylines and face turn  (2023–present)
On the January 9, 2023 episode of Impact!, Purrazzo confronted Gisele Shaw for mentioning Chelsea Green. Shaw got a bowl of food and was about to throw it at Purrazzo but she saw it coming and threw it all over Shaw’s face. Purrazzo thought it was hilarious turning face in the process, so Santino Marella stepped in and said that they could settle their differences at No Surrender. On February 24, 2023 at the event, Purrazzo was defeated by Shaw. In March 2023, the rematch between Purrazzo and Shaw was is set to take place at Sacrifice.

Lucha Libre AAA Worldwide

Reina de Reinas Champion (2021–2022) 
On May 1, 2021 (through Impact's talent sharing agreement with AAA), Purrazzo made her Mexican wrestling and AAA debut challenging Faby Apache at Triplemanía XXIX. Purrazzo won this Champion vs. Champion match, winning the AAA Reina de Reinas title while defending the Impact Knockouts Championship. On April 23, 2022 at Rebellion, she lost the title to Taya Valkyrie, ending her reign at 252 days.

All Elite Wrestling (2022)
On April 1, 2022, Purrazzo would also be booked for the Multiverse of Matches at WrestleCon, which was held on the same night as Supercard of Honor XV; as such, she was unable to attend the event. Mercedes Martinez would then become interim champion of the ROH Women's World Championship by defeating Willow Nightingale. during the event, setting up for a championship unification match with Purrazzo. The match took place on the May 4 episode of Dynamite, where Purrazzo would be defeated by Martinez in the main event.

Professional wrestling style and persona 
Purrazzo describes her style as "very meticulous and very methodical", looking for her Fujiwara armbar submission hold, being called "The Fujiwara Armbar Specialist". She is also nicknamed "The Virtuosa", a nickname she chose since she was looking for a moniker that would not only reflect her technical abilities in the ring, but also gave femininity, elegance, and grace to her persona.

Championships and accomplishments 
 Dynamite Championship Wrestling
 DCW Women's Championship (1 time)
 East Coast Wrestling Association
 ECWA Women's Championship (1 time)
 ECWA Super 8 ChickFight Tournament (2015, 2016)
 ECWA Year-End Award (4 times)
 Match of the Year (2016) – 
 Most Popular Wrestler (2016)
 Most Shocking Moment (2016) – for winning back to back ECWA Women's Super 8 Tournaments
 Wrestler of the Year (2016)
Game Changer Wrestling
 GCW Women's Championship (1 time)
 Impact Wrestling
 Impact Knockouts Championship (2 times)
 Impact Knockouts World Tag Team Championship (1 time) – with Chelsea Green
 Homecoming King and Queen Tournament (2021)  – with Matthew Rehwoldt
 IMPACT Year End Awards (4 times)
 Wrestler of the Year (2020)
 Knockout of the Year (2020, 2021)
 Knockouts Match of the Year (2021) 
Lucha Libre AAA Worldwide
AAA Reina de Reinas Championship (1 time)
Lucha Libre World Cup: 2023 Women's division – with Jordynne Grace and Kamille
 Monster Factory Pro Wrestling
 MFPW Girls Championship (1 time)
 New York Wrestling Connection
 NYWC Starlet Championship (1 time)
 Paradise Alley Pro Wrestling
 Center Ring Divas Championship (1 time)
 Pro Wrestling Illustrated
 Ranked No. 3 of the top 150 female wrestlers in the PWI Women's 150 in 2021
 Ring of Honor
 ROH Women's World Championship (1 time)
 ROH Year-End Award (1 time)
 WOH Wrestler of the Year (2017)

References

External links 

 Deonna Purrazzo's Impact Wrestling profile
 
 
 
 

1994 births
Living people
American female professional wrestlers
American professional wrestlers of Italian descent
People from Jefferson Township, New Jersey
People from Livingston, New Jersey
Professional wrestlers from New Jersey
21st-century American women
21st-century professional wrestlers
AAA Reina de Reinas Champions
TNA/Impact Knockouts World Champions
TNA/Impact Knockouts World Tag Team Champions
ROH Women's World Champions